Crescent Beach, Ontario can mean the following places:
Crescent Beach, Simcoe County, Ontario
Crescent Beach, York Regional Municipality, Ontario